Admiral José de Ribas y Boyons (6 June 1749 – ), known in Italian as Giuseppe de Ribas and in Spanish as José Pascual Domingo de Ribas y Boyons and in Russian as Iosif (Osip) Mikhailovich Deribas, was a Spanish military officer in Russian service. In recognition of de Ribas' famous victory at nearby Khadjibey, the future city's most famous street, Derybasivska, was named after him. José de Ribas was one of the principal figures on the monument of Catherine the Great in Odesa and there is a small personal monument to him at the beginning of Derybasivska Street.

Life
Son of the Spanish consul in Naples, the capital of the Kingdom of Naples, and his Irish wife, he had been born in that city, then dynastically joined to the Kingdom of Spain, and served in the Neapolitan army in the late 1760s, but later joined the Russian Imperial Army as a "member of the Spanish nobility" in 1772, taking part in the Russo-Turkish War of 1768-1774 and afterwards remaining "on the margins of the Empress's court" as "one of the many young men hoping to gain [her] favour." When the Russo-Turkish War of 1787-1792 broke out, he was made the liaison between Grigory Potemkin and the unit commanded by John Paul Jones:He worked assiduously to smoothe relations between Jones and the European officers, especially Nassau-Siegen, as well as with Potemkin. He dealt with cases of insubordination and drunkenness by talking firmly with the offenders rather than exacting immediate punishment. His performance was noted and rewarded. Potemkin personally transferred him from the navy and placed him in charge of an army detachment under the operational command of Count Ivan Gudovich, one of the most decorated and accomplished generals in the southern theater.In late 1789, de Ribas's grenadiers captured Khadjibey (the village on the future site of Odesa) without a battle: "It was, in fact, one of the great non-battles of the war. The entire affair lasted no more than half an hour. The Ottoman garrison, a few-dozen startled soldiers and their senior officer, surrendered on the spot."

His greatest deed was the storming of Izmail in 1790 under the supreme command of Alexander Suvorov. De Ribas proposed a plan of attack, which was approved by Suvorov, and led both Russian navy and land forces to capture the mighty fortress. The defeat was seen as a catastrophe in the Ottoman Empire, while in Russia it was glorified in the country's early, unofficial national anthem, "Let the thunder of victory sound!". In 1791 de Ribas was promoted to rear admiral and commander of the Russian Black Sea Fleet. He was promoted to vice admiral in 1795 and to full admiral in 1796.

Shortly after the end of the war, he proposed a plan to Catherine of transforming the Ottoman garrison town of Khadjibey into a major Russian port with an ice-free harbor; she accepted the idea, and on 27 May 1794, she issued an edict ordering its development as a commercial and shipping center and naming de Ribas the chief administrator (glavnyi nachal'nik) of the project. He began constructing stone houses and administrative buildings and may have been the one to suggest naming the city after the ancient Greek town of Odessos (though Catherine is said to have insisted on a feminine ending, making it Odesa).

As a son-in-law of Ivan Betskoy and a secretary to Prince Potemkin, he became one of the earliest administrators of Novorossiya. He may have been involved in the conspiracy to overthrow Emperor Paul, but died several months before the coup took place. Contemporaries thought he had been poisoned by one of the conspirators, Count von der Pahlen, to keep him from revealing the plot under the effects of the fever. De Ribas died in Saint Petersburg. His tomb is in the Smolensky Lutheran Cemetery.

See also 
 Odesa Museum of Regional History

References

Bibliography

 
 
 

Imperial Russian Navy admirals
Russian city founders
18th century in Ukraine
1749 births
1800 deaths
Recipients of the Order of St. George of the Second Degree
Recipients of the Order of St. George of the Third Degree
18th-century military personnel from the Russian Empire
Mayors of Odesa
Spanish emigrants to the Russian Empire
Burials at Smolensky Lutheran Cemetery
Paul I of Russia